My Struggle usually refers to Mein Kampf, an autobiography by Adolf Hitler.

My Struggle may also refer to:

 My Struggle (Knausgård novels), a novel series by Karl Ove Knausgård
 "My Struggle" (The X-Files), a 2016 episode
 My Struggle, a book by Booji Boy
 My Struggle, a book by Vladimir Zhirinovsky
 My Struggle, a spoof memoir by Paul Merton